Gay Blackstone (born March 27, 1952) is an American television and stage producer, director, consultant, lecturer and author. She was president of the Academy of Magical Arts and was named one of "2007 Hollywood's Women of Distinction" by the Hollywood Chamber of Commerce. She is also the international ambassador of the International Brotherhood of Magicians. Blackstone was the executive producer for the 2013 revival of the television show Masters of Illusion.

The second wife of Harry Blackstone Jr., she was married to him for 23 years.

References

American magicians
Living people
Place of birth missing (living people)
1952 births